The Masonic Temple is a historic building located in Kingman, Arizona. The temple was built in 1939 for Kingman Masonic Lodge No. 22. Designed in the Moderne style, it was the second of two WPA Projects in Kingman.  The temple is next door to the old post office.

Prior to 1939, Kingman Lodge No. 22 had met in the Odd Fellows meeting hall.  As both fraternal organizations grew, the Masons decided that they needed their own building.  Today, the downstairs of the  temple is used for office space for downtown area of Kingman.  Kingman Masonic Lodge and The Order of Eastern Star still meet in the upper floor of the Temple. The temple is on the National Register of Historic Places.

References

External links
 

Clubhouses on the National Register of Historic Places in Arizona
Buildings and structures in Kingman, Arizona
Former Masonic buildings in Arizona
Masonic buildings completed in 1939
Masonic buildings in Arizona
National Register of Historic Places in Kingman, Arizona
1939 establishments in Arizona